Sir James Spaight (1818 – 21 January 1892) was an Irish Conservative politician.

Family
Spaight was the second son of Francis Spaight — the owner of the ill-fated Francis Spaight ship - and Agnes Paterson, daughter of James Campbell Paterson. He married Elizabeth Alason Eckford, daughter of John Eckford, in 1850.

He was the President of the Limerick Chamber from 1871–92, his father Francis was President from 1847–61. He was the vice-president of the Limerick Protestant Young Mens Association.

Political career
He was a subscriber and council member and then, in 1869, president of the Athenaeum. In 1853, he was High Sheriff of Limerick City and later, in 1856, 1877 and 1883, he was Mayor of Limerick. From 1871 to his death, he was president of the Limerick Chamber of Commerce. At some point, he was also a Justice of the Peace and Deputy Lieutenant for County Tipperary.

Spaight was elected unopposed as MP for Limerick City at a by-election in May 1858 but lost the seat at the next general election in 1859. He attempted to regain the seat on multiple occasions — in 1865, 1874, 1879, 1880, 1883 and 1885 — but was each time unsuccessful.

Spaight was knighted in 1887.

Recreation
James Spaight was the owner of a beautiful yacht named 'the Gossamer'. in 1846 he took a party of friends out on Lough Derg on Friday and returned back to Derry Castle at 10 o'clock. the yacht was powered by steam, and all the fires were quenched before the party disembarked. the yacht was found to be completely burned to the waterline the following morning. Was it malicious? We cannot say.

In 1846, James Spaight was made Commodore of Lough Derg Yacht Club.

James Spaight was owner of the 12 ton sailing yacht 'Gem' in 1847, and competed in Lough Derg Yacht Club.

References

External links
 

1818 births
1892 deaths
UK MPs 1857–1859
Mayors of Limerick (city)
Deputy Lieutenants of Tipperary
Deputy Lieutenants in Ireland
High Sheriffs of Limerick City
Irish Conservative Party MPs
Irish justices of the peace
Irish knights
Members of the Parliament of the United Kingdom for County Limerick constituencies (1801–1922)
Politicians awarded knighthoods